This is a list of notable Barbadian British people (i.e. Barbadian immigrants to the UK and British-born individuals of Barbadian ethnic or national origin).

 Nigel Benn, former boxer
 Dennis Bovell, reggae musician and producer
 Ashley Cole, England international footballer, Bajan father
 Carl Cox, techno DJ, born in Barbados
 Des'ree, singer, Bajan father
 Digga D, rapper
 Livvi Franc, singer-songwriter
 Fredo, rapper
 Kieran Gibbs, England and Arsenal F.C. footballer, Bajan father
 David Harewood, actor
 Guy Hewitt, High Commissioner 2014-2018 and Activist for the Windrush Generation
 Chris Jordan, cricketer
 Jofra Archer, cricketer
 Shaznay Lewis, singer-songwriter, member of All Saints, Bajan father
 Mark Morrison, singer
 Redd Pepper, voice actor
 Nevada Phillips, cricketer
 Leigh-Anne Pinnock, member of British girl group Little Mix
 Oliver Skeete, showjumper, born in Speightstown
 Moira Stuart, newsreader and broadcaster, Bajan father
 Sir Michael Stoute, thoroughbred horse trainer, born in St. Michael's Parish
 Swarmz, rapper
 Walter Tull, footballer and British army officer, his father Daniel Tull was born in Barbados
 Alison Hinds, popular female Barbadian Soca singer, (born in England to  Barbadian parents)
 Gary Younge, journalist, author and broadcaster
 Benjamin Zephaniah, writer and poet, Bajan father
 La'Vere Corbin-Ong, footballer (Barbadian) father)
 Rhian Brewster, footballer (Barbadian) father)

See also
 Barbadian British
 List of Barbadians
 List of Barbadian Americans
 Barbadian Canadians

References

External links
 National Council of Barbadian Associations (UK)

 
Barbadian
Barbadian Britons